Premiere Trade Plaza Tower III is a 13-story office building in downtown Orlando, Florida. The building was completed in 2006 is part of a three building complex known as Premier Trade Plaza.

In 2007, developer Cameron Khun announced that the presumptive anchor tenant had decided against buying 60,000 square feet of office condominium space in the plaza, thus not permitting them to retain the naming rights for the buildings. The naming rights for the plaza and the two office towers cost $300,000 per year.

See also
Dynetech Centre 
List of tallest buildings in Orlando
Premiere Trade Plaza Office Tower II
Solaire at the Plaza

References

Skyscraper office buildings in Orlando, Florida
Office buildings completed in 2006
2006 establishments in Florida